The Call, is a 2020 South Korean thriller film directed by Lee Chung-hyun, starring Park Shin-hye and Jeon Jong-seo. Based on the 2011 British and Puerto Rican film The Caller, The Call revolves around Seo-yeon (Park Shin-hye) and Young-sook (Jeon Jong-seo), two women from different times who connect through a phone call that interchanges their fates. The film was originally going to be released theatrically but cancelled due to the COVID-19 pandemic. It was released on Netflix globally on November 27, 2020.

Plot
In 2019, 28-year-old Kim Seo-yeon loses her cellphone while traveling to visit her sick, estranged mother in a rural area. Arriving at her rundown childhood home, she finds a decades-old cordless phone, and through it receives calls from a distressed woman who says she's being tortured by her mother. After investigating the house, Seo-yeon figures out that the woman on the phone, Oh Young-sook, is living in the same house but in 1999. The two are able to communicate across time through the phone, and exchange information about their lives. Young-sook is orphaned and lives with her adoptive mother, who is a shaman, while Seo-yeon lost her father in a fire that she blames her mother, Eun-ae, for.

Young-sook, acting on information from Seo-yeon, sneaks out of the house to prevent the fire that killed Seo-yeon's father. She is successful, and Seo-yeon's reality changes: her parents are both alive and healthy, and their house is lavish. Young-sook, however, is punished by her mother, and becomes resentful that Seo-yeon's life is improved while hers is the same.

Seo-yeon searches the internet and learns that Young-sook was killed by her mother during an exorcism. During the next phone call, Seo-yeon warns Young-sook, who saves herself and kills her mother instead. Now freed, Young-sook becomes a serial killer. Seo-yeon realizes what has happened when Young-sook's victims disappear in the present day. During a phone call, Seo-yeon confronts Young-sook, but inadvertently reveals to her that she'll be arrested.

In 1999, Young-sook is visited by an 8-year-old Seo-yeon and her father, who has come to the house to close their purchase of it. Young-sook kills Seo-yeon's father and takes young Seo-yeon captive. In 2019, Seo-yeon's reality changes again: her father is dead and the house in even worse condition. Young-sook calls Seo-yeon and tells her to find out how she'll be arrested. At first Seo-yeon feeds Young-sook false info, but when Young-sook threatens to kill Eun-ae next, Seo-yeon breaks into the local police station for the notebook used in 1999. Young-sook taunts Seo-yeon that they're the same when she reveals that Seo-yeon caused the fire that originally killed her father, and lied about Eun-ae being responsible.

Seo-yeon gives Young-sook the correct info, and her reality changes again: the house is now owned by an older Young-sook, who has continued as a serial killer. The content of the notebook changes as well, with a note that Eun-ae came to the house with a police officer and made a call on the cordless phone. Seo-yeon waits in the house for the call and uses it to warn Eun-ae.

In 1999, Young-sook kills the police officer and chases Eun-ae. In 2019, older Young-sook reveals herself and similarly chases Seo-yeon. Eun-ae uses the phone again, and Seo-yeon picks up and encourages her to fight. Eun-ae seemingly sacrifices herself to kill Young-sook, and 2019 changes, with the house becoming derelict and old Young-sook disappearing. Seo-yeon leaves the house and is reunited with Eun-ae, who is alive and well, albeit with scars.

In a mid-credits scene, older Young-sook calls her younger counterpart to warn her about Eun-ae and the police officer arriving, allowing Young-sook to alter her own history, resulting in the erasing of Eun-ae from present day Seo-yeon's side. The scene then cuts to the torture room where a person tied to a chair and covered in a white cloth is screaming for help. The cloth is removed, revealing a frightened adult Seo-yeon, once again a captive of Young-sook.

Cast
 Park Shin-hye as Kim Seo-yeon
 Jeon Jong-seo as Oh Young-sook
 Kim Sung-ryung as Eun-ae, Seo-yeon's mother.
 Lee El as Ja-ok, Young-sook's mother
 Oh Jung-se as Seong-ho 
 Lee Dong-hwi as Baek Mi-hyun
 Park Ho-san as Mr. Kim (Seo-yeon's father)
 Park Hyung-soo as Man-voice
 Kim Min-ha as Young Seon-hee

Production
Principal photography began on January 3, 2019, and wrapped on April 2, 2019.

Reception

Awards and nominations

References

External links
 
 
 
 
 
 

2020 films
2020 thriller films
South Korean thriller films
Films set in 1999
Films set in 2019
Films set in 2020
South Korean remakes of foreign films
Next Entertainment World films
Films postponed due to the COVID-19 pandemic
Films not released in theaters due to the COVID-19 pandemic
Korean-language Netflix original films